Bradford Jon Leonard (born 8 November 1979) is a New Zealand cricketer who made three appearances for Northern Districts cricket team during the 2005–06 season. A right-arm medium-fast bowler, he took two one day wickets.

External links
 
 

1979 births
Northern Districts cricketers
New Zealand cricketers
Living people
Place of birth missing (living people)
21st-century New Zealand people